Kanchana Ganga may refer to:
 Kanchana Ganga (1984 film), a Telugu-language romantic drama film
 Kanchana Ganga (2004 film), a Kannada-language romantic drama film